The 2020 Triple J Hottest 100 was announced on 23 January 2021. It is the 28th countdown of the most popular songs of the year, as chosen by listeners of Australian radio station Triple J. The countdown was announced on the fourth weekend of January.

English band Glass Animals was voted into first place with their single "Heat Waves", becoming the first British act to top the annual list in 11 years, with the previous case being when Mumford & Sons won the 2009 countdown with "Little Lion Man". Australian band Lime Cordiale achieved the most entries in the countdown, at five.

Background 
Triple J's Hottest 100 allows members of the public to vote online for their top ten songs of the year, which are then used to calculate the year's 100 most popular songs. Any song initially released between 1 December 2019 and 30 November 2020 was eligible for 2020's Hottest 100.

Voting opened on 8 December 2020. Several artists and presenters made their votes public, including Billie Eilish, Flume, and Glass Animals. The artists most often voted for by these artists were Tkay Maidza, Tame Impala, Spacey Jane, and The Strokes.

Projections 
Prior to the countdown, two favourites had emerged. Various music blogs and bookmakers placed "Heat Waves" by English psych-pop band Glass Animals and "Booster Seat" by Australian indie-rock band Spacey Jane as the two songs most likely to take first place. Glass Animals previously placed 12th in 2014, also ranking in the top 40 in 2016 and 2019; while Spacey Jane debuted at 80th in 2019. Both songs respectively placed in first and second on the countdown.

Full list

Countries represented
 Australia – 66
 United States – 24
 United Kingdom – 14
 Canada – 3
 Japan – 3
 Ghana – 1
 Italy – 1
 New Zealand – 1

Artists with multiple entries

Five entries
 Lime Cordiale (11, 16, 20, 25, 26)

Four entries
 Spacey Jane (2, 15, 28, 81)
 G Flip (three times solo and once with Illy) (7, 44, 78, 95)
 Juice Wrld (twice solo, once as co-lead artist, and once with the Kid Laroi) (39, 40, 49, 60)

Three entries
 Glass Animals (1, 18, 51)
 Tame Impala (5, 17, 33)
 Billie Eilish (10, 79, 90)
 Joji (59, 62, 98)

Two entries
 Flume (once as lead artist and once as remixer/producer) (3, 54)
 Ball Park Music (4, 63)
 The Jungle Giants (8, 89)
 Ocean Alley (14, 72)
 Halsey (once solo and once with Machine Gun Kelly) (19, 36)
 Mac Miller (23, 24)
 Skegss (27, 66)
 San Cisco (31, 56)
 DMA's (32, 52)
 Amy Shark (34, 65)
 The Kid Laroi (37, 60)
 Bring Me the Horizon (38, 71)
 Ruel (45, 83)
 AJ Tracey (48, 94)
 Stormzy (48, 97)
 Headie One (once solo/as co-lead artist and once with Stormzy) (48, 97)
 Hockey Dad (96, 99)

Notes
With 66 tracks by Australian artists, the 2020 countdown ties 2016's record for the most Australian tracks in a single countdown.
Two artists, Peking Duk and DMA's, appeared in their seventh consecutive annual Hottest 100. In doing so, ties them for the 2nd longest consecutive streak alongside Regurgitator between 1995 and 2001, The Whitlams between 1996 and 2002 and Something For Kate between 1997 and 2003. They sit only 3 behind The Living End, whose tracks featured for ten years in a row between 1997 and 2006.
With "I'm Good?" being voted in at number 9, Hilltop Hoods marked their 22nd track to appear in an annual Hottest 100, equaling the record currently shared by Powderfinger and Foo Fighters. 
This year's countdown included six songs from Indigenous Australian artists, surpassing 2019's record of five. Gamilaraay man The Kid Laroi featured twice, while there was one track each from: Torres Strait Islander woman Sycco; Butchulla/Nguburinji man Birdz; Beddy Rays, who are fronted by Wapabara man Jackson Van Issum; and Gamilaraay woman Thelma Plum.
At number 6, "WAP" became the first song by a female rapper to enter the top 10, with Cardi B and Megan Thee Stallion becoming the highest charting women of colour in Hottest 100 history.
At number 49 with their track "Pretty Lady", Tash Sultana is the first openly non-binary artist to feature in the countdown. Sultana has previously featured in the Hottest 100, with two songs in the 2016 countdown including the number three spot with "Jungle". Sam Smith had featured on two tracks by Disclosure prior to their coming out.
Juice Wrld, who died in December 2019, was posthumously voted into the countdown four times: at number 39 on "Righteous", at number 40 with Marshmello on "Come & Go", at number 49 with "Wishing Well", and at number 60 with the Kid Laroi on "Go".
Mac Miller, who died in September 2018, was also posthumously voted into the countdown, appearing at numbers 23 and 24 with "Good News" and "Blue World", respectively. Miller was also the first deceased artist to feature on the countdown since Ou Est Le Swimming Pool, having previously been voted in at number 60 in the 2018 countdown with "Ladders".
Tash Sultana, who identifies as non-binary (and uses the pronoun they), is the only artist who identifies as neither male nor female to feature. They came in at number 46 with "Pretty Lady". Sultana has previously featured in the countdown, with "Jungle" appearing at number 3 in the 2016 countdown. Sultana is the most successful gender-diverse artist in the history of the Hottest 100. (G Flip, who appeared in the 2018, 2019 and 2020 countdowns, came out as non-binary in 2021.)
Flume became the first artist to have appeared in each of the top 5 spots of the countdown across the years. "Never Be Like You" placed first in 2016, "Rushing Back" came second in 2019, "The Difference" placed third in 2020, "Holdin' On" placed fourth in 2012 and "Drop the Game" placed fifth in 2013.

Top 10 Albums of 2020
The annual Triple J album poll was held across November and December and was announced on 13 December 2020.

References

2020